The Householder is a 1960 English-language novel by Ruth Prawer Jhabvala. It is about a young man named Prem who has recently moved from the first stage of his life, a student, to the second stage of his life, a householder. The book is a bildungsroman, which is a story where the protagonist develops mind and character as he passes from childhood through various experiences usually through a spiritual crisis into maturity.

A film adaptation of The Householder was released in 1963, and Jhabvala started her career as a screenwriter by co-writing its screenplay with director James Ivory. It was also Ivory's directorial debut (not including documentary shorts) as well as his first collaboration with producer Ismail Merchant.

Characters
Prem
Indu, Prem's Wife
Prem's mother
Mr. Khanna, the principal of the college where Prem works as a teacher
Mrs. Khanna
Mr. Chaddha, the history teacher
Mr. Sohan Lal, the math teacher
Raj, Prem's high school friend
Hans Loewe, Kitty, and Mohammed, white people living in India and their servant
Mr. Seigal, Prem's landlord

References 

1960 British novels
Indian bildungsromans
Novels set in Delhi
Indian novels adapted into films
Postcolonial novels
British novels adapted into films
1960 Indian novels
John Murray (publishing house) books